Tore Eugen Kvalheim (born 4 March 1959) is a Norwegian trade unionist.

An infantry captain in the Norwegian Army, he became chief of negotiation in the trade union Norwegian Military Officers' Association. In 2001 he became leader of YS Stat, the division for state employees in the Confederation of Vocational Unions. He also became deputy leader, and in 2006 leader of the Confederation of Vocational Unions. He resigned in 2013 to become director of the employers' association Spekter.

References

1959 births
Living people
Norwegian trade unionists
Norwegian Army personnel